The Love Songs is the fourth compilation album by Chris de Burgh, released by A&M Records in 1997. Three new tracks are included in addition to songs found on previous albums, several of which were re-recorded for this release.

Track listing
All songs written by Chris de Burgh.

"Here Is Your Paradise"
"Missing You"
"So Beautiful" (previously unreleased)
"In Love Forever" (new recording)
"Borderline"
"The Lady in Red"
"Much More Than This"
"It's Me (And I'm Ready To Go)" (previously unreleased)
"Separate Tables" (new recording)
"Fatal Hesitation"
"Forevermore" (previously unreleased)
"The Head and the Heart"
"Lonely Sky" (new remix)
"Suddenly Love"
"If You Really Love Her, Let Her Go" (new recording)
"In a Country Churchyard" (new recording)

Charts

References

External links
 The Official Chris de Burgh Website

Chris de Burgh albums
1997 greatest hits albums
A&M Records compilation albums